Alessandro Porro, C.R. (1600–1660) was a Roman Catholic prelate who served as Bishop of Bobbio (1650–1660).

Biography
Alessandro Porro was born in 1600 in Milan, Italy and ordained a priest in the Congregation of Clerics Regular of the Divine Providence.
On 5 Dec 1650, he was appointed during the papacy of Pope Innocent X as Bishop of Bobbio.
On 21 Dec 1650, he was consecrated bishop by Marcantonio Franciotti, Cardinal-Priest of Santa Maria della Pace, with Gasparo Cecchinelli, Bishop of Corneto e Montefiascone, and Giovanni Tommaso Pinelli, Bishop of Molfetta, serving as co-consecrators.
He served as Bishop of Bobbio until his death on 15 Sep 1660.

References

External links and additional sources
 (for Chronology of Bishops) 
 (for Chronology of Bishops)  

17th-century Italian Roman Catholic bishops
Bishops appointed by Pope Innocent X
1600 births
1660 deaths
Clergy from Milan
Theatine bishops